This is a list of 133 species in Eusphalerum, a genus of ocellate rove beetles in the family Staphylinidae.

Eusphalerum species

 Eusphalerum aetolicum (Kraatz, 1858) g
 Eusphalerum akikoae Watanabe, 1999 c g
 Eusphalerum albertae Zanetti, 1981 g
 Eusphalerum albipile (Fauvel, 1900) g
 Eusphalerum alpinum (Heer, 1839) g
 Eusphalerum alticola Zanetti, 2004 c g
 Eusphalerum anale (Erichson, 1840) g
 Eusphalerum angusticolle Fauvel, 1871 g
 Eusphalerum angustum (Kiesenwetter, 1850) g
 Eusphalerum annaerosae Zanetti, 1986 g
 Eusphalerum bargaglii (Luze, 1910) g
 Eusphalerum baudii (Fiori, 1894) g
 Eusphalerum bivittatum (Eppelsheim, 1887) g
 Eusphalerum bolivari (Koch, 1940) g
 Eusphalerum brandmayri Zanetti, 1981 g
 Eusphalerum calabrum Zanetti, 1980 g
 Eusphalerum californicum (Fauvel, 1878) g
 Eusphalerum cariniphallum Zanetti, 1998 c g
 Eusphalerum caucasicum (Bernhauer, 1908) g
 Eusphalerum celsum (Luze, 1910) g
 Eusphalerum cerrutii (Bernhauer, 1940) g
 Eusphalerum chinecum Li, 1992 c g
 Eusphalerum chinense Bernhauer, 1938 c g
 Eusphalerum clavipes (Scriba, 1868) g
 Eusphalerum coiffaiti Nicolas, 1974 g
 Eusphalerum contortispinum Zanetti, 1998 c g
 Eusphalerum convexum Fauvel, 1878 g b
 Eusphalerum corsicum (Luze, 1910) g
 Eusphalerum cribrellum (Fauvel, 1900) g
 Eusphalerum croaticum (Luze, 1910) g
 Eusphalerum daxuense Zanetti, 2004 c g
 Eusphalerum dissimile (Luze, 1910) g
 Eusphalerum dubitatum Zanetti, 1998 c g
 Eusphalerum elongatum (Ganglbauer, 1895) g
 Eusphalerum erdaoense Zanetti, 2004 c g
 Eusphalerum farrarae (Hatch, 1944) g
 Eusphalerum fenyesi  b
 Eusphalerum ferruccii Zanetti, 2004 c g
 Eusphalerum formosae Cameron, 1949 c g
 Eusphalerum foveicolle (Fauvel, 1871) g
 Eusphalerum fujianense Zanetti, 2004 c g
 Eusphalerum grayae (Hatch, 1944) g
 Eusphalerum hapalaraeoides Zanetti, 1998 c g
 Eusphalerum hispanicum (Brisout de Barneville, 1866) g
 Eusphalerum horni  b
 Eusphalerum impressicolle (Kiesenwetter, 1850) g
 Eusphalerum italicum (Koch, 1938) g
 Eusphalerum jiudingense Zanetti, 2004 c g
 Eusphalerum jizuense Zanetti, 2004 c g
 Eusphalerum kahleni Zanetti, 1986 g
 Eusphalerum kraatzii (Jacquelin du Val, 1857) g
 Eusphalerum kubani Zanetti, 2004 c g
 Eusphalerum lapponicum (Mannerheim, 1830) g
 Eusphalerum liepolti (Bernhauer, 1943) g
 Eusphalerum limbatum (Erichson, 1840) g
 Eusphalerum lindbergi (Bernhauer, 1931) g
 Eusphalerum luteicorne (Erichson, 1840) g
 Eusphalerum luteoides Zanetti, 1998 c g
 Eusphalerum luteum (Marsham, 1802) g
 Eusphalerum macropterum (Kraatz, 1857) g
 Eusphalerum malaisei Scheerpeltz, 1965 c g
 Eusphalerum marshami (Fauvel, 1869) g
 Eusphalerum masatakai Watanabe, 1999 c g
 Eusphalerum metasternale (Fauvel, 1898) g
 Eusphalerum miaoershanum Watanabe, 1999 c g
 Eusphalerum michaeli Zanetti, 2004 c g
 Eusphalerum minutum (Fabricius, 1792) g
 Eusphalerum miricolle (Sainte-Claire Deville, 1901) g
 Eusphalerum mocsarkii Bernhauer, 1913 c g
 Eusphalerum montivagum (Heer, 1839) g
 Eusphalerum morator Zanetti, 1986 g
 Eusphalerum nigriceps (Fauvel, 1871) g
 Eusphalerum nitidicolle (Baudi, 1857) g
 Eusphalerum oblitum (Fairmaire & Laboulbène, 1856) g
 Eusphalerum obscuriceps Zanetti, 1998 c g
 Eusphalerum obsoletum (Erichson, 1840) g
 Eusphalerum obtusicolle (Fauvel, 1876) g
 Eusphalerum occidentale Coiffait, 1959 g
 Eusphalerum octavii (Fauvel, 1871) g
 Eusphalerum orientale  b
 Eusphalerum pallens (Heer, 1841) g
 Eusphalerum palligerum (Kiesenwetter, 1847) g
 Eusphalerum parareitteri Zanetti, 1998 c g
 Eusphalerum parnassicum (Bernhauer, 1910) g
 Eusphalerum paucisetulosum Zanetti, 1998 c g
 Eusphalerum petzi (Bernhauer, 1910) g
 Eusphalerum petzianum (Bernhauer, 1929) g
 Eusphalerum pfefferi (Roubal, 1941) g
 Eusphalerum pothos (Mannerheim, 1843) g b
 Eusphalerum primulae (Stephens, 1834) g
 Eusphalerum procerum (Baudi di Selve, 1857) g
 Eusphalerum pruinosum (Fauvel, 1871) g
 Eusphalerum pseudaucupariae (E.Strand, 1916) g
 Eusphalerum pseudoreitteri Zanetti, 1998 c g
 Eusphalerum puetzi Zanetti, 2004 c g
 Eusphalerum pulcherrimum (Bernhauer, 1901) g
 Eusphalerum pyrenaeum Tronquet & Zanetti, 2008 g
 Eusphalerum rectangulum (Baudi, 1870) g
 Eusphalerum reflexum Zanetti, 2004 c g
 Eusphalerum rizzottivlachi Zanetti, 1992 g
 Eusphalerum robustum (Heer, 1839) g
 Eusphalerum rougemonti Zanetti, 2004 c g
 Eusphalerum ruffoi (Scheerpeltz, 1956) g
 Eusphalerum rugulosum (Méklin, 1853) g b
 Eusphalerum schatzmayri (Koch, 1938) g
 Eusphalerum schillhammeri Zanetti, 2004 c g
 Eusphalerum scribae (Schaufuss, 1862) g
 Eusphalerum segmentarium (Méklin, 1852) g
 Eusphalerum semicoleoptratum (Panzer, 1794) g
 Eusphalerum settei Zanetti, 1982 g
 Eusphalerum sibiricum Luze, 1910 c g
 Eusphalerum sicanum Zanetti, 1980 g
 Eusphalerum sichuanense Zanetti, 2004 c g
 Eusphalerum signatum (Märkel, 1857) g
 Eusphalerum simpliciphallum Zanetti, 1998 c g
 Eusphalerum smetanai Zanetti, 1998 c g
 Eusphalerum solitare Sharp, 1874 c g
 Eusphalerum songpanense Zanetti, 2004 c g
 Eusphalerum sorbicola Kangas, 1941 c g
 Eusphalerum stramineum (Kraatz, 1857) g
 Eusphalerum stussineri (Bernhauer, 1909) g
 Eusphalerum subsolanum Herman, 2001 g
 Eusphalerum swauki (Onibathum) swauki Hatch, 1957 g b
 Eusphalerum taiwanense Zanetti, 1998 c g
 Eusphalerum tempestivum (Erichson, 1840) g
 Eusphalerum tenenbaumi (Bernhauer, 1932) g
 Eusphalerum torquatum (Marsham, 1802) g
 Eusphalerum tronqueti Zanetti, 2004 c g
 Eusphalerum tronquetianum Zanetti, 2004 c g
 Eusphalerum umbellatarum (Kiesenwetter, 1850) g
 Eusphalerum viertli (Ganglbauer, 1895) g
 Eusphalerum zerchei Zanetti, 1992 g
 Eusphalerum zhongdianense Zanetti, 2004 c g

Data sources: i = ITIS, c = Catalogue of Life, g = GBIF, b = Bugguide.net

References

Eusphalerum